Leo Boccardi (born 15 April 1953) is a prelate of the Catholic Church who had worked in the diplomatic service of the Holy See. He has been an archbishop and apostolic nuncio since 2007.

Biography
Boccardi was born in San Martino in Pensilis, Italy. He was ordained to the priesthood on 24 June 1979 by Pope John Paul II. He entered the diplomatic service of the Holy See on 13 June 1987 and then worked in several countries before returning to the offices of the Secretariat of State in Rome.

On 24 March 2001, Pope John Paul II named him to represent the Holy See before several international organizations.

On 16 January 2007, Boccardi was named titular archbishop of Bitettum and Apostolic Nuncio to Sudan. On 30 January he was named Nuncio to Eritrea as well. He received his episcopal consecration on 18 March 2007 from Cardinal Tarcisio Bertone.

On 11 July 2013, Boccardi was appointed Nuncio to Iran.

Following the death of Qassem Soleimani Archbishop Boccardi saying that the arms of negotiation and justice need to be used. Tensions need to be lowered. All parties need “to believe in dialogue, knowing from what history has always taught, that war and weapons” do not resolve the problems afflicting the world. “We must believe in negotiation,” he reiterated.

On 11 March 2021, Pope Francis appointed him Apostolic Nuncio to Japan.

See also
 List of heads of the diplomatic missions of the Holy See

References

External links

 Archbishop Leo Boccardi at Catholic-Hierarchy 

1953 births
Living people
People from the Province of Campobasso
21st-century Italian Roman Catholic titular archbishops
Apostolic Nuncios to Eritrea
Apostolic Nuncios to Sudan
Apostolic Nuncios to Iran
Apostolic Nuncios to Japan
Diplomats of the Holy See